Baba Lului's Mosque, also known as Baba Lavlavie's Masjid, is a medieval mosque and tomb complex in Behrampura area of Ahmedabad, India.

History and architecture
The mosque was built circa 1560 by Baba Lului, or Baba Muhammad Jafar, believed to be a pearl merchant. The interior dimensions of the mosque are 69 feet in length by 37 feet in width. There are twelve pillars which are two storeys high, support the central dome. There are more forty-four pillars which support the roof of the mosque and the arches in the facade. There are four perforated stone windows in the back wall and the three mihrabs of carved marble. There are two minarets are on each end of the facade. They have base of fourteen square feet and their niches are decorated with floral patterns. The mosque was damaged in 2001 Gujarat earthquake and was restored by Archaeological Survey of India.

References 

Mosques in Ahmedabad
Monuments of National Importance in Gujarat
Mosques completed in 1560